The Masked Lover is a 2017 Taiwanese television series created and produced by Sanlih E-Television. Starring Weber Yang, Mini Tsai, Kurt Chou and Genie Chen as the main cast. Filming began on February 20, 2017 and wrapped up on July 17, 2017. First original broadcast on TTV every Sunday at 10:00 pm starting March 26, 2017, with the last episode aired on July 30, 2017.

Cast

Main cast
Weber Yang as Gu Le Jun 
Mini Tsai as Wu Ping Fan / Wu Ping An 
Rose Qiu as young Ping Fan
Melody Qiu as young Ping An
Kurt Chou as Zhao Tian Xing 
Genie Chen as Gu Jing Xuan

Supporting cast
Lin Yu-pin as He Mi Qi
Deyn Lee as Li Da Qiang (Xiao Zhi) 
Chiung-Tzu Chang as Ye Feng Jiao 
Chang Fu-chien  as captain
Fu Lei as Gu Zheng Yi 
Hui Hsiao as Wang Yu Ling  
Elten Ting as Wang Hui Lan
Paul Hsu as Ceng Guo Hao 
Calvin Lee as Zhuang Jing Fan 
Knox Chen as Ah Liang 
Yue-Feng Wang as Xiao Min Qian (Hei Biao) 
Zhuang Xin Yu as Wu Xiao Jing 
Lung Shao-hua as Rong Fu Xiong 
Ed Chan as Da Fei

Special appearances
Frankie Huang as Ah Gou 
Wang Dao-Nan as He Jian Min 
Wu Kang-jen as Huo Ting En 
Enson Chang as Jiang Sheng Xi 
Huang Xin Di as Li Wan Yu

Soundtrack
My Extraordinary Love 我的愛情不平凡 by Lin Yu-pin 阿喜
I'm Burning by Ian Chen 陳彥允
Dream Lover 夢中情人 by Ian Chen 陳彥允
Lonely Planet 寂寞星球 by Ian Chen 陳彥允
Adventure Novel 冒險小說 by Ian Chen 陳彥允
Being Happy to the Point of Impossibility 快樂到不可能的事 by Lin Yu-pin 阿喜
Love & Hug 你的擁抱 by JR 紀言愷 & Lin Yu-pin 阿喜
Sparkling Fireworks I Love You 煙火燦爛我愛你 by JR 紀言愷

Broadcast

Episode ratings
Competing dramas on rival channels airing at the same time slot were:
 FTV - She's Family, Far and Away, The Best of Youth
 EBC Variety - The King of Romance, Love, Timeless
 PTS - The Teenage Psychic
 CTS - Doctors
 CTV - Attention, Love!

Crossover episodes
On April 16, 2017, The Masked Lover had a crossover with The Perfect Match.

References

External links
The Masked Lover TTV Website  
The Masked Lover SETTV Website 
 

2017 Taiwanese television series debuts
2017 Taiwanese television series endings
Taiwan Television original programming
Sanlih E-Television original programming
Taiwanese romance television series
Taiwanese romantic comedy television series